Battle of Hummelshof took place on July 19, 1702 (O.S.) near the small town Hummelshof in Swedish Livonia (present-day Estonia). It was the second significant Russian victory in the Great Northern War in which a Russian army under Boris Sheremetev attacked a much smaller force under Wolmar Anton von Schlippenbach and defeated it after experiencing similar casualties to the Swedes. This was a final blow to the Swedish force defending Livonia and the defeat left it fully open to Russian attacks.

References

Hummelshof
1702 in Europe
Hummelshof
Military history of Estonia
Hummelshof
Hummelshof
Tõrva Parish
18th century in Estonia